Arthur Hollins may refer to:

Arthur Hollins (politician) (1876–1962), English Member of Parliament for Hanley (UK Parliament constituency) in the 1920s and 1930s
Arthur Hollins (footballer), English footballer with Walsall and Southampton in the 1910s
Sir Arthur Hollins, 2nd Baronet (1876–1938), English cricketer and football administrator